The following radio stations broadcast on FM frequency 104.9 MHz:

Argentina
 EXN Radio in Rosario, Santa Fe
 LRS780 Cadena Regional in Máximo Paz, Santa Fe 
 Radio María in Quimili, Santiago del Estero

Australia
 hit104.9 The Border in Albury
 Triple M Sydney
 Base FM in Perth
 8MIX in Darwin
 Rhema FM in Mount Gambier
 SBS Radio in Woomera
 Sunshine FM in Buderim

Canada (Channel 285)
 CBDC-FM in Mayo, Yukon
 CBDN-FM in Dawson, Yukon
 CBON-FM-21 in Gogama, Ontario
 CBQL-FM in Savant Lake, Ontario
 CBYQ-FM in Queen Charlotte, British Columbia
 CFJR-FM in Brockville, Ontario
 CFMG-FM in Edmonton, Alberta
 CKKS-FM-2 Vancouver, British Columbia
 CFWF-FM in Regina, Saskatchewan
 CFXM-FM in Granby, Quebec
 CHHO-FM-1 in St-Alexis-des-Monts, Quebec
 CHWC-FM in Goderich, Ontario
 CIBM-FM-2 in Trois-Pistoles, Quebec
 CIMY-FM in Pembroke, Ontario
 CJLA-FM in Lachute, Quebec
 CKBC-FM in Bathurst, New Brunswick
 CKNX-FM-2 in Centreville, Ontario
 CKRE-FM in Ahtahkakoop First Nation, Saskatchewan
 CKTR-FM in North Bay, Ontario
 CKVX-FM in Kindersley, Saskatchewan

China (mainland) 
 CNR Business Radio in Huangshan
 CNR Music Radio in Shenzhen, Zhongshan and Zhuhai
 CNR The Voice of China in Jinzhou and Yangquan

Colombia
  in Bogotá, CU

Hong Kong 
 Transfers CNR Music Radio

Jamaica
BBC World Service

Macau 
 Transfers CNR Music Radio

Malaysia
 Ai FM in Johor Bahru, Johor and Singapore
 Melody in Taiping, Perak
 Sinar in Kota Kinabalu, Sabah
 Zayan in Klang Valley, Eastern Pahang and Seremban, Negeri Sembilan

Mexico
XHAND-FM in Puruándiro, Michoacán
XHBD-FM in Banderilla, Veracruz
XHCSFT-FM in Bacalar, Quintana Roo
XHCUL-FM in Culiacán, Sinaloa
XHCZ-FM in San Luis Potosí, San Luis Potosí
XHERK-FM in Tepic, Nayarit
XHESO-FM in Ciudad Obregón, Sonora
 XHEXA-FM in Mexico City
XHKS-FM in Saltillo, Coahuila
 XHLN-FM in Linares, Nuevo León
 XHLNC-FM in Tecate, Baja California
 XHMC-FM in Mexicali, Baja California
 XHMDA-FM in Monclova, Coahuila
 XHMEX-FM in Ciudad Guzmán, Jalisco
 XHMLO-FM in Malinalco, Estado de México
 XHNAQ-FM in Querétaro, Querétaro
 XHNLR-FM in Nuevo Laredo, Tamaulipas
 XHNVG-FM in Nuevo Casas Grandes, Chihuahua
XHPBNM-FM in Nochistlán de Mejía, Zacatecas
 XHPMOC-FM in Ciudad Cuauhtémoc, Chihuahua
 XHPSEB-FM in San Sebastián Tecomaxtlahuaca-Santiago Juxtlahuaca, Oaxaca
 XHREC-FM in Villahermosa (Miguel Hidalgo Primera Sección), Tabasco

Philippines
  in Bacolor, Pampanga

Sierra Leone
 Capital Radio Sierra Leone in Freetown & Kenema

United Kingdom
 BBC Radio 4 in Betws Y Coed, Clyro Powys, Haverfordwest, Porthmadog and Pwhelli, Stirling 
 BBC Radio Cymru in South Wales 
 BBC Radio Leicester in Leicester 
 BBC Radio Nan Gaidheal in Argyll & Bute, Highland, Islay, Isle of Lewis, Ullapool 
 BBC Wiltshire in Marlborough 
 Dales Radio in Yorkshire Dales 
 Imagine FM in Stockport 
 Radio X in London 
 Sunshine in Belfast 
 DCR (Dover Community Radio) 104.9FM in Dover, Kent.

United States (Channel 285)
 KAGH-FM in Crossett, Arkansas
 KAKD in Dillingham, Alaska
  in Deer Park, Texas
 KAPY-LP in Duvall, Washington
  in Oskaloosa, Iowa
 KBTE in Tulia, Texas
  in La Grange, Texas
 KCLT in West Helena, Arkansas
  in Tipton, California
  in Lake City, Arkansas
  in Spokane, Washington
 KEPD in Ridgecrest, California
 KEUC in Ringwood, Oklahoma
 KFBA-LP in Bakersfield, California
 KFFX (FM) in Emporia, Kansas
  in Hope, Arkansas
 KHUH-LP in Seattle, Washington
 KIBE in Broken Bow, Oklahoma
 KIIK-FM in De Witt, Iowa
  in Cascade, Montana
 KISK in Cal-Nev-Ari, Nevada
 KJAV in Alamo, Texas
 KKWD in Bethany, Oklahoma
  in Eldorado, Texas
  in Hampton, Iowa
  in Clearmont, Wyoming
  in Tallulah, Louisiana
  in Robstown, Texas
 KMRR in Spencer, Iowa
  in Mesilla Park, New Mexico
 KNLX in Prineville, Oregon
 KNXX in Donaldsonville, Louisiana
 KPWB-FM in Piedmont, Missouri
 KQAT-LP in Hallsville, Texas
 KRCB-FM in Rohnert Park, California
  in Bristow, Oklahoma
 KRFO-FM in Owatonna, Minnesota
 KRIG-FM in Nowata, Oklahoma
  in Cheyenne, Wyoming
 KRYD (FM) in Norwood, Colorado
 KSAL-FM in Salina, Kansas
 KTCH in Emerson, Nebraska
 KTDD in Eatonville, Washington
 KTLK-FM in Columbia, Illinois
  in York, Nebraska
 KTOC-FM in Jonesboro, Louisiana
 KTXX-FM in Bee Cave, Texas
 KVOU-FM in Uvalde, Texas
 KWBT (FM) in Bellmead, Texas
 KWCX-FM in Tanque Verde, Arizona
 KWIM in Window Rock, Arizona
 KWLY-LP in Missoula, Montana
 KWRY in Rye, Colorado
 KWSP-LP in Kerrville, Texas
 KXEA in Lowry City, Missouri
  in Springdale, Arkansas
 KXSC in Sunnyvale, California
 KYIX in South Oroville, California
 KYKA in Meadow Lakes, Alaska
 KYOM-LP in Wichita, Kansas
 KYTN in Union City, Tennessee
 KYXE in Union Gap, Washington
 KZEQ-LP in Harrison, Arkansas
  in Pilot Point, Texas
 KZQM in Sequim, Washington
  in Moss Bluff, Louisiana
 WAIR (FM) in Lake City, Michigan
 WAXI in Rockville, Indiana
 WBHS-LP in Brunswick, Georgia
 WBLN-LP in Glens Falls, New York
  in Metter, Georgia
  in Woodbury, Tennessee
  in Moss Point, Mississippi
 WBXX (FM) in Marshall, Michigan
 WCIM in Montour Falls, New York
 WCPN in Lorain, Ohio
 WCSD-LP in Shawnee-On-Delaware, Pennsylvania
  in Gahanna, Ohio
  in Solana, Florida
 WCWB in Marathon, Wisconsin
 WDLN-LP in Dunnellon, Florida
 WEGE in Lima, Ohio
  in Muncie, Indiana
 WFIW-FM in Fairfield, Illinois
  in Frankfort, Kentucky
 WFMZ (FM) in Hertford, North Carolina
 WFTU (AM) in Riverhead, New York
 WFXE in Columbus, Georgia
 WGSL in La Crosse, Wisconsin
 WHLB-LP in Cartersville, Georgia
  in Havana, Florida
  in White Stone, Virginia
  in Middletown, Connecticut
  in Columbus, Indiana
 WINU in Altamont, New York
  in Easton, Pennsylvania
  in Jamestown, Kentucky
 WKDL in Brockport, New York
  in Leitchfield, Kentucky
 WKJN in Centreville, Mississippi
  in Vanceburg, Kentucky
 WKOS in Kingsport, Tennessee
  in Iuka, Mississippi
 WLHH in Ridgeland, South Carolina
  in Wolfeboro, New Hampshire
 WMCG in Milan, Georgia
  in Christiansted, Virgin Islands
  in Reedsburg, Wisconsin
  in Gloucester, Massachusetts
  in Ozark, Alabama
  in Denmark, Wisconsin
  in Clarksburg, West Virginia
 WPLA in La Follette, Tennessee
 WPXN (FM) in Paxton, Illinois
  in Alma, Michigan
 WRBB in Boston, Massachusetts
 WRBF in Plainville, Georgia
 WREA-LP in Holyoke, Massachusetts
 WRKT in North East, Pennsylvania
  in Hollidaysburg, Pennsylvania
 WROO in Mauldin, South Carolina
  in Egg Harbor City, New Jersey
  in Stanton, Kentucky
  in York, Alabama
 WSSM in Prentiss, Mississippi
 WSTV in Roanoke, Virginia
  in Hartford, Wisconsin
 WTSX-LP in Kokomo, Indiana
 WVDV-LP in Sebring, Florida
 WVRX in Strasburg, Virginia
  in Caldwell, Ohio
 WWKY-FM in Providence, Kentucky
  in Scranton, Pennsylvania
 WXCL in Pekin, Illinois
 WXKW (FM) in Key West, Florida
  in Harold, Kentucky
  in Belvidere, Illinois
  in High Springs, Florida
  in Calabash, North Carolina
  in Hinsdale, New Hampshire
  in Balsam Lake, Wisconsin

References

Lists of radio stations by frequency